Harbourview  is a  neighbourhood in Dartmouth, Nova Scotia. Located in central Dartmouth, it abuts the HRM Capital District and overlooks Halifax Harbour. The community is dominated by the Angus L. Macdonald Bridge, completed in 1955.

Major employers in Harbourview include the Harbourview Holiday Inn, Dartmouth Shopping Centre and the Defence Research and Development Canada (Atlantic).

References

Communities in Halifax, Nova Scotia
Dartmouth, Nova Scotia